All My Yesterdays is a big band jazz recording of the Thad Jones/Mel Lewis Jazz Orchestra playing at the Village Vanguard club in New York City in February and March 1966.  The February 7 tracks are the first recordings of the group at this club although the recording was not released until 2016.   A 50-year tradition for Monday nights at the Village Vanguard began from this first evening for the Thad Jones/Mel Lewis Jazz Orchestra which later became the Mel Lewis Jazz Orchestra and eventually the Vanguard Jazz Orchestra.

The release includes a 92-page book, featuring rare, previously unpublished photos, essays, interviews and memoirs.

Track listing
Disc 1
"Back Bone" – 13:22
"All My Yesterdays"  4:22
"Big Dipper" – 5:51
"Mornin' Reverend" – 4:49
"The Little Pixie" – 	14:25
"Big Dipper" (alt. take) – 5:44

Disc 2
"Low Down" – 4:38
"Lover Man (Oh Where Can You Be?)" (Davis, Ramirez, Sherman) – 5:25
"Ah, That's Freedom" – 10:08
"Don't Ever Leave Me" – 4:28
"Willow Weep for Me" (Ronell) – 6:15
"Mean What You Say" – 5:51
"Once Around" – 12:45
"Polka Dots and Moonbeams" (Van Heusen, Burke) – 4:02 
"Mornin' Reverend" – 5:49
"All My Yesterdays" – 4:25 
"Back Bone" – 12:59

All songs composed by Thad Jones except as noted

Personnel
 Thad Jones – flugelhorn
 Mel Lewis – drums
 Hank Jones – piano
 Richard Davis – bass
 Sam Herman – guitar
 Jerome Richardson – alto saxophone, soprano saxophone, clarinet, bass clarinet, flute
 Jerry Dodgion – alto saxophone
 Joe Farrell – tenor saxophone, clarinet, flute
 Eddie Daniels – tenor saxophone, clarinet, bass clarinet
 Pepper Adams – baritone saxophone
 Snooky Young – trumpet
 Jimmy Owens – trumpet
 Bill Berry – trumpet
 Jimmy Nottingham – trumpet
 Bob Brookmeyer – trombone
 Jack Rains – trombone
 Garnett Brown – trombone
 Cliff Heather – trombone

References / external links

2016 live albums
The Thad Jones/Mel Lewis Orchestra live albums